"Collision resolution" may refer to:

 Hash table implementations in computer science
 Collision response in classical mechanics

Compare:

 Collision avoidance (networking) in telecommunications